Oberdan is the 1932 book by Italian author and historian Francesco Salata. It may also refer to:

 Oberdan (name), list of people with the name
 Lungotevere Guglielmo Oberdan, stretch of the Lungotevere boulevard in Rome, Italy